John Ericsson Memorial, located near the National Mall at Ohio Drive and Independence Avenue, SW,
in Washington, D.C., is dedicated to the man who revolutionized naval history with his invention of the screw propeller.

The memorial was authorized by Congress August 31, 1916, and dedicated May 29, 1926 by President Calvin Coolidge and Crown Prince Gustaf Adolf of Sweden. Congress appropriated $35,000 for the creation of the memorial, and Americans chiefly of Scandinavian descent raised an additional $25,000.

The national memorial is managed by National Mall and Memorial Parks.

Images

See also
 List of public art in Washington, D.C., Ward 2

References

External links

John Ericsson Memorial official NPS website

1926 establishments in Washington, D.C.
1926 sculptures
Granite sculptures in Washington, D.C.
National Mall and Memorial Parks
Outdoor sculptures in Washington, D.C.
Monuments and memorials on the National Register of Historic Places in Washington, D.C.
Sculptures of men in Washington, D.C.
Sculptures of women in Washington, D.C.
Southwest (Washington, D.C.)
Union (American Civil War) monuments and memorials in Washington, D.C.
Works by James Earle Fraser (sculptor)